A Foreign Affair is an album by American jazz fusion band Spyro Gyra. The album is the story of five men and their love affair with music. The album contains a Hindi song Khuda sung by Arijit Singh, composed by Sandeep Chowta and co-produced by Chowta and Spyro Gyra. It is the first time a Western group has released a song with lyrics entirely in Hindi.

Track listing

Release and chart history 
The album was released on September 13, 2011. Upon release the album was positioned at No. 2 on the Billboard 200 Albums chart.

Release history

Critical reception
AllMusic's Jonathan Widran opined that "the most interesting tracks are the beautiful, poignant vocal tracks by Keb' Mo' and Fernandez" and stated the band "still had something fresh to say while fearlessly entering their fifth decade of recording". JazzTimes's Brian Soergel concluded the review stating "this is the CD that many casual Spyro Gyra fans have been waiting for". Howard Dukes from Soul Tracks praised the songs in the album and stated "The ease in which the band amalgamates different international influences on A Foreign Affair is a reminder of why we call music the international language".

Personnel 
Credits for A Foreign Affair are adapted from AllMusic and Discogs.

Spyro Gyra
 Jay Beckenstein – saxophones
 Tom Schuman – keyboards
 Julio Fernández – guitars, vocals (6)
 Scott Ambush – bass guitar
 Bonny Bonaparte – drums, percussion, backing vocals (6)

Additional musicians
 Pedrito Martinez – congas
 Sandeep Chowta – duduk (2), tabla (2)
 Tosin Aribisala – percussion (11)
 Arijit Singh – vocals (2)
 Keb' Mo' – vocals (10)

Production 
 Spyro Gyra – producer
 Sandeep Chowta – co-producer (2)
 Paul Antonell – engineer
 Connor Milton – assistant engineer
 Elijah Walker – assistant engineer
 Martin Walters – mixing 
 Adam Ayan – mastering
 Peter Ambush – cover illustration 
 Phil Brennan – photography, management

Studios 
 Recorded at Clubhouse Recording Studios (Rhineback, NY) and Menekeys Recording Studios (Union City, NY).
 Mixed at Big Time Audio (Jonesborough, TN).
 Mastered at Gateway Mastering (Portland, ME).

References 

2011 albums
Spyro Gyra albums